"Are You There (with Another Girl)" is a song written by Burt Bacharach and Hal David for American singer Dionne Warwick. Her version, released as a single in December 1965, eventually reached number 39 on the Billboard charts. It also appears as the tenth track on her album Here I Am (1965).

Author Serene Domenic praised the song in the book Burt Bacharach Song by Song, writing of its "droning strings", "strange fret-sliding guitar", and orchestral crescendos which precede the Beatles' "A Day in the Life" (1967). He also speculates that the song influenced Beach Boys composer Brian Wilson for the Pet Sounds track "Let's Go Away for Awhile" (1966).

Personnel
 Dionne Warwick – lead singer
 Myrna Warwick – "oom pah pah pity the girl" backing vocals

Chart positions

Cover versions

References

1965 singles
1965 songs
Songs with lyrics by Hal David
Songs with music by Burt Bacharach
Dionne Warwick songs
Scepter Records singles
Songs about infidelity